The municipal stadium of Ait Melloul is a football stadium located in the city of Ait Melloul in Morocco. It is the main stadium for Union Ait Melloul and can host up to 5,000 fans.

References

External links 

 Official website of Union Ait Melloul (in Arabic and French)

Football venues in Morocco
Buildings and structures in Souss-Massa